Marina is a village and a municipality in Split-Dalmatia County, Croatia. It has a population of 4,595 (2011 census), 97.6% of whom are Croats.

There are 15 settlements incorporated into Marina Municipality, it is the most western municipality in Split-Dalmatia County and is bordering Šibenik-Knin County.
Marina is located on the Adriatic Highway (D8). It is a tourist village with a pebble beach shaded by olive and pine trees. Tourist also enjoy the atmosphere of ancient Dalmatian wine cellars, fresh fish and quality local wines, a blend of the ancient and the modern. Yachting, diving and fishing are practiced. Small yachts may dock within the small harbour and larger ones at the end of the bay, southeast of the chapel and south of the Plokata hill.

History 
The settlement was planned in the 16th century. In the period 1495-1500 the bishops of Trogir built a quadrangular tower on the islet in the bay. The tower has console battlements. The channel between the mainland and the tower was filled up and levelled at the beginning of the 20th century.  The structure was repaired during the Cretan war in 1657 and 1717 and reconstructed in 1971 to 1972.  The church of St John has Gothic and Renaissance elements. In a field close to the village there is a small Gothic church of St. Luke with the coat of arms of the Sobota family.

References

External links 
 

Populated places in Split-Dalmatia County
Municipalities of Croatia